The Fatuha train crash was a rail transport accident that occurred on 4 April 1998, in India. Removal of fishplates led to the packed Howrah-Danapur Express jumping tracks, killing at least 11 passengers and injuring more than 50 others near Fatuha Station in Fatuha city on the Eastern Railway's Danapur division. In all, nine bogies derailed disrupting traffic.

Local citizens assisted the injured at the scene until authorities arrived. The remaining passengers were taken to Patna by a special train. While 11 passengers died at the scene, one succumbed to injuries in Patna Medical College hospital.

"Prima facie, the cause of the accident is removal of fish plates on the right side of the tracks," railway officials said.

References

Derailments in India
Railway accidents in 1998
Railway accidents and incidents in Bihar
History of Bihar (1947–present)